Sagaa is a 2019 Indian Tamil-language action crime film directed by Murugesh. It was produced by R. Selvakumar and Ramprasath. The film features an ensemble cast including Saran Shakthi, Ayra,  Kishore,  Sree Raam, Pandi, Ayra, Neeraja, and Prithvi Rajan. Music director Shabir composed the songs and background music. Niran Chander handled the cinematography, while Hariharan did the editing. The film released on 1 February 2019 to mixed reviews from critics criticizing the writing, dialogues and cinematography.

Synopsis 
The movie is set in the dark areas of a bustling metro. Orphans Sathya (Saran Shakthi) and Kathir (Pandi) are raised by a local transgender woman. They are orphaned again when she is killed by her brother over a property dispute. Sathya and Kathir avenge her death and then land in jail.

While in jail, Kathir is killed by a rowdy named Ganga (Prithvi Rajan). Sathya vows to kill Ganga. He befriends inmates Shiva (Kishore) and Jacky (Sree Raam) and escapes with them, but Jacky gets caught. After that, Shiva and Sathya separate. The warden learns of their escape. He catches Shiva and pushes him to reveal Sathya's whereabouts. Shiva leads him to a house where Sathya is hiding but is shocked to find his sweetheart Pooja (Neeraja) instead. He is killed by the warden for showing the wrong place.

Meanwhile, Sathya gets on a bus. One of the warden's henchmen arrives to kill him. He falls in love with Aarohi (Ayra), a young girl who saves him from the henchman. Later, he is seen fighting with Ganga, but Ganga is killed by Jacky. Jacky reveals that his sister Jeni (Gayathri Krishnaa) was raped and killed by Ganga, and he sought revenge. Sathya beats up Ganga. The movie ends with Sathya telling Aarohi that he will come back for her one day.

Cast 

 Saran Shakthi as Sathya
 Ayra as Aarohi, Sathya's love interest
 Kishore DS as Shiva
 Sree Raam as Jacky
 Pandi as Kathir
 Neeraja S Das as Pooja, Shiva's love interest
 Prithvi Rajan as Ganga
 Thennavan as Rajendran, a jail warden
 Sai Dheena as Jail Warden
 Ambani Shankar as Convict
 Gayathri Krishnaa as Jeni, Jacky's sister
 Vinod Sagar as Jail Warden
 Ravi Venkatraman as Anbumani IPS
 Kannan
 Harish
 Subash
 Baby Savi
 Master Vikash
 Master Bubesh

Production 

Sagaa is SellyCinemas' debut film venture. Pre-production commenced in January 2015. Principal photography began in EVP film city in Chennai. The film's jail sets were constructed and erected by SellyCinemas. The filming progressed at the coastal areas of Tamil Nadu and Pondicherry and concluded in Karnataka and Andhra Pradesh. The film released on 1 February 2019.

Soundtrack 

Shabir signed on to the project in early 2015. The album consists of 7 songs. Shabir had reportedly collaborated with a European orchestra to produce one of the pieces. The album features Malaysian and international Tamil rap pioneer Dr. Burn, South East Asian metal band Rudra, singer and actress Andrea Jeremiah, playback singer Naresh Iyer, and gospel singer Alphonse. The soundtrack was produced in four countries including Singapore, Hungary, Malaysia and India. The initial single "Sevulu Kizhiyum" was released on 9 May 2016. The music video featuring Shabir and the cast was released on YouTube by Think Music India. The hit single "Yaayum" took its lyric from classical Tamil poetic work Kuṟuntokai from Sagaa achieved millions of views on YouTube. The album  received rave reviews with IndiaGLitz calling it "Strikingly Impressive".

Release 
The Times of India gave the film two out of five stars and wrote that "Sagaa is a classic example of bad writing ruining a premise that has promise". News Indian express gave the film 2 out of 5 writing "While, it is impressive that he doesn't pull back any punches because his actors play boys, and not men, they are hence burdened with pointless romantic numbers, sacrificial side-kicks, too many slow-motion shots, hollow punch dialogues, and inconsequential heroines."

References

External links 

2019 films
Indian crime action films
2019 crime action films
2010s Tamil-language films
Indian buddy films